Full Fathom Five is a live album by the band Clutch. The full name of the album is Full Fathom Five: Audio Field Recordings, differentiating it from the accompanying DVD release Full Fathom Five: Video Field Recordings.

The DVD and Album differ in that four cities recorded at are on the DVD, but the album has only three cities, being: The Metro Theatre, Sydney, NSW, Australia (tracks 11-15, December 15, 2007); The Starland Ballroom, Sayreville, NJ (tracks 4 & 5, December 29, 2007 and tracks 6 & 7, December 28th 2007); and Mr Smalls Theatre, Pittsburgh, PA (tracks 1-3 and 8-10, March 20, 2008).

The reference to the HiFi Bar as the Sydney concert in some source material is incorrect, as it is in Melbourne, Victoria, Australia (900 kilometers south of Sydney), which is from another live Australian recording, Heard It All Before: Live at the Hi Fi Bar. The same owners did open a venue in Sydney in 2012 with the same name.

Track listing

Personnel
Neil Fallon – Vocals, Guitar
Tim Sult – Guitar
Dan Maines – Bass
Jean-Paul Gaster – Drums, Percussion
Mick Schauer – Hammond B3, Piano, Hohner Clavinet

References

Clutch (band) live albums
2008 live albums